Top Cow Productions is an American comic book publishing company and an imprint of Image Comics.

Titles

0–9
 21
 39 Minutes

A
 Angelus #1–6
 Angelus Pilot Season #1
 Aphrodite IX #0–4
 Aphrodite IX vol.2, #1–11
 Aphrodite IX Pilot Season #1
 Aphrodite V #1–4
 Ascension #0–22
 Arcanum #1/2–8
 Artifacts #0–40
 A Voice in the Dark #1–7

B
 Ballistic #1—3 (September—November 1995)
 Ballistic Action #1 (May 1996)
 Ballistic Imagery #1 (January 1996)
 Ballistic Studios Swimsuit Special #1 (May 1995)
 Battle of the Planets #1—12 (July—September 2003) — licensed to, but not owned by, Top Cow
 Battle of the Planets: Jason #1 (July 2003)
 Battle of the Planets: Manga #1—3 (November 2003—January 2004)
 Battle of the Planets: Mark #1 (May 2003) — licensed to, but not owned by, Top Cow
 Battle of the Planets: Princess #1—6 (November 2004—May 2005) — licensed to, but not owned by, Top Cow
 Battle of the Planets/ThunderCats #1 (May 2003) — co-published with WildStorm
 Battle of the Planets/Witchblade: Savior #1 (February 2003)
 Berserker #0—16 (February 2009—June 2010)
 Blood Legacy #1–4 (May—November 2000)
 Blood Legacy: The Young Ones #1 (April 2003)
 Broken Trinity #1—3 (July—November 2008)
 Broken Trinity: Aftermath #1 (April 2009)
 Broken Trinity: Angelus #1 (December 2008)
 Broken Trinity: The Darkness #1 (August 2008)
 Broken Trinity: Pandora's Box #1—6 (February 2010—April 2011)
 Broken Trinity: Prelude (May 2008, Free Comic Book Day exclusive)
 Broken Trinity: Witchblade #1 (December 2008)
 Bushido: The Way of the Warrior #1—5 (October 2013)
 Butcher Knight #1—4 (December 2000—June 2001)

C
 City of Heroes #1–20 (licensed to, but not owned by, Top Cow)
 Codename: Strykeforce #0–14
 Common Grounds #1–6
 Cyberforce #0–4
 Cyberforce vol. 2, #1–35
 Cyberforce vol. 3, #0–6
 Cyberforce vol. 4, #1–11
 Cyberforce: Origins #1–3
 Cyblade Pilot Season #1
 Cyblade #1–4

D
 The Darkness #0–40, ½, 75–116
 The Darkness vol. 2, #1–24
 The Darkness vol. 3, #1–10
 The Darkness: Black Sails #1
 The Darkness: Infinity #1
 The Darkness: Wanted Dead
 The Darkness: Level #0–5
 The Darkness vs. Eva #1–4 (by Leah Moore and John Reppion, with art by Edgar Salazar)
 The Darkness/Pitt #1–3
 Down #1–4
 Dragon Prince

E
 Echoes #1–6
 EVO #1
 E.V.E. Protomecha
Epoch #1–5

F
 Fathom #0–14, ½, −6 (published by Top Cow, owned by Aspen MLT)
 Fathom Crossover Tour Book (published by Top Cow, owned by Aspen MLT)
 Fathom Killian's Tide #1–4 (published by Top Cow, owned by Aspen MLT)
 Fathom Swimsuit Special (published by Top Cow, owned by Aspen MLT)
 Freshmen #1–5
 Freshmen: Yearbook
 Fusion (crossover with Marvel Comics)

G
 God Complex #01–06

H
 Human Kind #01–05
 Hunter-Killer #0–12
 Hunter-Killer: Dossier

I
 Impaler
 In the Dust

J

K
 Kin

L
 Lady Pendragon

M
 The Magdalena #1–3
 The Magdalena vol. 2, #1–4
 The Magdalena vol. 3, #1–12
 The Magdalena/Daredevil #1
 Madame Mirage
 Midnight Nation #1–12, ½ (Joe's Comics)
 Misery Special
 Mysterious Ways #1–6
 Myth Warriors #1

N
 The Necromancer #1–6
 The Necromancer Pilot Season #1
 Nine Volt #1–4
 No Honor #1–4

O

P
 Pilot Season
 Proximity Effect #1–3
Postal

Q

R
 Ravine #1–2
Ripclaw #1–3, ½
Ripclaw vol. 2, #1–6
 Ripclaw Special
 Ripclaw Pilot Season #1
 Rising Stars #1–24 (Joe's Comics)
 Rising Stars: Bright #1–3
 Rising Stars: Untouchable
 Rising Stars: Voices of the Dead #1–5

S
 Soul Saga #1–5
 Spirit of the Tao #1–15
 Strykeforce #1–5
Sunstone #1–5

T
 Tales of the Darkness #1–4, ½
 Tales of the Witchblade #1–9, ½
 Think Tank
 Tokyo Knights #1
 Tom Judge: The Rapture #1
 Tomb Raider #0–50, ½  (licensed to, but not owned by, Top Cow)
 Tomb Raider: Journeys #1–12
 Tomb Raider: Takeover #1
 Tracker
 Twilight Guardian #1–4

U
 Unholy Union #1
 Universe #1–8

V
 Velocity #1–3
 Velocity vol. 2, #1–4
 Velocity Pilot Season #1
 V.I.C.E. #1–5

W
 Wanted #1–6
 Weapon Zero #T-4 – 0
 Weapon Zero vol. 2 #1–15
 Witchblade #½, 0–185, Annual #1–2 
 Witchblade: Animated #1
 Witchblade: Blood Oath #1
 Witchblade: Demon #1
 Witchblade: Destiny's Child #1–3
 Witchblade: Infinity #1
 Witchblade: Nottingham #1
 Witchblade: Obakemono #1
 Witchblade: Origin Special

X

Y

Z

References

External links
 Top Cow official site
 
 

Top Cow Productions